Dive guide may refer to:
Dive leader or Divemaster, A recreational dive leader certification and role.
Dive guide (publication), a Travel guide publication for a dive site or region.